Hold On It Hurts is the 1994 debut album by Cornershop. It failed to reach commercial success, but went some way in helping the band find its niche in the following years.

Track listing 
All lyrics written by Tjinder Singh; all music composed by Cornershop, except where noted.
"Jason Donovan/Tessa Sanderson" – 2:31
"Kalluri's Radio" – 4:20
"Readers Wives" – 3:40
"Change" – 1:57
"Inside Rani" – 3:22
"Born Disco; Died Heavy Metal" – 3:40
"Counteraction" – 2:42
"Where D'U Get Your Information" – 3:16
"Tera Mera Pyar" – 2:04
"You Always Said My Language Would Get Me into Trouble" – 7:07

US bonus tracks (Lock Stock & Double~Barrel EP)
"England's Dreaming" – 3:36
"Trip Easy" – 2:59
"Summer Fun in a Beat Up Datsun" (Lyrics by Ben Ayres, music by Cornershop) – 1:31
"Breaking Every Rule Language English" – 3:17

Personnel 
Cornershop
 Tjinder Singh – vocals, bass
 Avtar Singh – guitar
 Ben Ayres – guitar, vocals
 Wallis Healey – guitar
 Anthony "Saffs" Saffery – sitar, keyboards
 David Chambers – drums

Other musicians
 Emma Davies – keyboards
 Alastair Dickins – clarinet
 Raj Patel – dholki
 Dale Shaw – vocals

Technical
 John Wills – production (tracks 1., 2., 4., 6., 8.)
 Tjinder Singh – production (tracks 3., 5., 7., 9., 10.)
 John Robb – co-production (tracks 1., 2., 4. – 6., 8.), production (Lock Stock & Double~Barrel EP)
 Richard Whelan – engineering
 Andy Green – engineering
 Kevin Reverb – engineering
 Rob – engineering
 Charlie – engineering
 Rex – engineering (Lock Stock & Double~Barrel EP)
 Mike Marsh – mastering
 Malcolm Maybury – front cover photo
 Lloyd Thomas – inner sleeve art

References

1994 debut albums
Cornershop albums
Wiiija albums